Kumbrabow State Forest is a state forest in southern Randolph County, West Virginia.

References

External links

West Virginia state forests
Protected areas of Randolph County, West Virginia
Campgrounds in West Virginia